Multi, known by the old name of Multilaser, is an electronics company based in Brazil.

Former name Multilaser are manufacturers and marketers of tablets, media players, GPS, pen drives, computer accessories, games, smartphones, sporting goods, audio and video, with greater highlights for computer accessories, smartphones and tablets. Its headquarters is located in São Paulo and its industrial complex is located in Extrema, Minas Gerais.

It employs more than 2,500 employees and 40 engineers divided into laboratories in Brazil and Asia.

References

1987 establishments in Brazil
Electronics companies of Brazil
Manufacturing companies based in São Paulo
Mobile phone manufacturers
Mobile phone companies of Brazil
Brazilian brands